Jefferson County Public Schools (JCPS) is a public school district located in Jefferson County, Kentucky and operating all but one of the public schools in the county. It is governed by an elected seven-member Board of Education which selects and hires a Superintendent who serves as the system's chief executive.

JCPS operates 167 schools with more than students= 96,000  (2021-22) students, making it the 29th largest school district in the United States. In 2020-21 the system had a $1.8 billion budget and more than 18,000 employees. With a fleet of more than 1,500 vehicles, it operates one of the 10 largest transportation systems in the nation. Jefferson County's total population stands at approx. 760,000—by far the largest in the Commonwealth of Kentucky.

Board of Education

The seven members of the Jefferson County Board of Education (JCBE) are elected by general election to four-year terms. Each board member is responsible for an area of Jefferson County and the schools contained therein. The Superintendent, Dr. Marty Pollio, serves as secretary to the board at all meetings. The current board members are (in order of district number) Diane Porter, Dr. Chris Kolb, James Craig, Joseph Marshall, Linda Duncan, Rev. Daniel Corrie Shull, and Sarah McIntosh.

The board was very proactive in year 2011 and into 2012 regarding the request for a curriculum management audit, and work on a much needed strategic plan. The results of the audit were published in January 2012. The board reviewed the report and with board support Hargens followed through on the recommendations. The Strategic Plan-Vision 2015 was approved by the board on May 29, 2012. The process beginning at a much needed board retreat in October 2011 resulted in this important document. In addition, in 2011 the board approved Board Operating Principles to improve board governance.

History

Public education in the Louisville area dates to 1829 and the beginning of the Louisville Public School District. In 1838 a separate county school system began operating. In 1975 the two systems were merged by court order.

Louisville Public School District (1829–1975)

On April 24, 1829, the City of Louisville established the first public schools for children under sixteen years of age. A board of trustees was selected, and Edward Mann Butler was selected as the first head. The first school began operation in the upper story of a Baptist church on the SW corner of Fifth and Green Streets (now Liberty Street). The next year, the first public school building in the Louisville Public School District was erected at Fifth and Walnut (now Muhammad Ali Blvd). This property was purchased from one of the trustees for $2,100. Though Louisville's charter called provided for the establishment of free schools, the school established at Fifth and Walnut charged primary grades $1.00 per quarter of instruction and all other grades $1.50. Tuition was waived if the trustees felt a child was unable to pay. Instruction was given using the Lancastrian system of teaching, wherein higher-level students taught the younger while the teacher and assistants supervised and instructed these higher-level students.

After a few years, the state granted half of the property of the Jefferson Seminary for use in constructing a "High School College." By 1838, the city of Louisville had a full-service school system. Tuition was abolished for all Louisville residents in 1851, and 1856, Male High School and Female High School opened their doors. From 1851 until 1871, 17 schools were erected on 20 lots. School enrollment grew from 4,303 at the beginning of that time period to 13,503 at the end. In 1870, the first public schools in the city for African Americans were established in the Center Street African Methodist Church and the First Street African Baptist Church. The first school building for African American students was dedicated on October 7, 1873. At the end of the 1896-7 school year, enrollment reached 26,242 (20,559 white, 5,683 black). Ten years later (1907–1908), the school system's enrollment was 29,211 (23,458 white, 5,753 black). In 1912, the Louisville Public School District began annexing property in Jefferson County which had already been annexed by city government, bringing enrollment to 45,841 (33,831 white, 12,010 black) by the 1956 school year, the last year of segregated education in the public schools. In its final year as a separate school district, enrollment was 40,939 (19,171 white, 21,768 black).

Common Schools of Jefferson County/Jefferson County School District (1838–1975)

The Common Schools of Jefferson County school district (CSJC) was established by an act of state legislature in 1838. As of an 1840 report by the Superintendent of Public Education for the state, there were 30 schools in this district. In this report, the "whole population" of Jefferson County was figured at 36,310, with 5,843 of ages 5 to 15 and 3,744 from 7 to 17.
626 was reported as the number of students "at school." In 1850, 561 children were listed as attending six-month schools and 130 were listed as attending three-month schools. In the 1876-7 school year, 58 schools were reported for white children and 10 for black children.

In 1884, a state Board of Education was created and a county superintendent elected by popular vote to replace the appointed commissioner. In 1920 21 22 23 24 25, the County Administration Law was passed by state legislature, requiring the appointment of the superintendent by the Board of Education. Enrollment in the Jefferson County Schools in 1956 (last year of segregation) was 36,308 (34,911 white, 1,397 black). In the last year separate from Louisville Schools, enrollment was 89,405 (84,666 white, 4,739 black).

Merger and desegregation

In 1971, several civil rights organizations filed a lawsuit in court asking that the Louisville, Jefferson County and Anchorage school systems be merged. This was because of the large concentration of African Americans in the city school district and extremely low concentration in the other two. These organizations felt that this created conditions similar to that of segregation. In 1974, Judge James F. Gordon ordered the merger of the Louisville and Jefferson County school district, an order followed up by the state Board of Education, which on February 28, 1975, made the merger effective on April 1 of that year. A merger and desegregation plan was created, which included mandatory bussing and racial guidelines for school assignments. The initial plan was for black students to be bussed 10 of their 12 years in school and white students to be bussed 2 of 12 years. The court ceased active supervision of this plan in 1978.

The racial guidelines used have seen several revisions since that time. In 1984, a plan was instituted for middle and high schools that involved a system of zones and satellite areas. In 1992, Project Renaissance was implemented in the elementary schools, a program that achieved desegregation by allowing parents some choice in school placement. A mandatory 15–50% African-American population in all schools was established in 1996. Two years later, six parents sued to remove the upper limit from Central High School, a traditionally African-American school. On June 10, 1999, Judge John Heyburn II ruled that the 1975 desegregation order was not dissolved in 1978 when court supervision ended. Some elements of that original ruling were still in effect. Additionally, it was ruled that JCPS could use racial classifications to prevent emergence of racially identifiable schools. These proceedings resulted in the use of racial quotas at Central being banned and the school system being required to redesign its admission procedures by the 2002–03 school year.

The desegregation order was lifted in 2000, but JCPS maintained the 15–50% guideline in most schools. In 2002, Crystal Meredith filed a lawsuit on behalf of her son, whom she claims was denied enrollment in a school because of race. In 2002 board members Steve Imhoff and Larry Hujo first suggested that the board consider that the criteria of the plan be based upon the income of parents and not race (SES). The purpose was to maintain diversity with the thought the Supreme Court may strike the then plan based upon race alone. There was resistance but income did become the focal point of the plan adopted in 2008. In October 2005, the 6th U.S. Circuit Court of Appeals ruled against Meredith. In June 2006, the United States Supreme Court agreed to hear the case, the first time the high court has elected to rule on a school district's use of a voluntary desegregation plan. The case was combined with a similar one from Seattle, Washington involving that school districts use of a tiebreaker system for school assignment based on race.

In June 2007, the Supreme Court handed down a verdict in favor of the plaintiffs, holding that the school district plans in Louisville and Seattle violated constitutional guarantees of equal protection, and race could not be the only factor to consider. The board then amended the plan in 2008 to consider the income, education and minority status of parents in two geographic areas of the county which was later amended to apply to census tracts, based upon the 2010 census.

Recent superintendents
Donna Hargens was hired as superintendent in July 2011. Hargens was previously the chief academic officer for the Wake County Public Schools in North Carolina. Hargens resigned effective July 1, 2017 in an agreement with the Jefferson County Board of Education. Hargens was the second female superintendent for public schools in Louisville. The first was Rosa Anna Phillips Stonestreet. She served in this post from 1898 to 1910, when the structure for governance was changed with no more elections for the post.

Previously, Sheldon Berman was hired in 2007. Upon his termination, he accepted a position as superintendent of the Eugene (Oregon) School District. Before Berman, Dr. Stephen Daeschner had been superintendent since 1993. When his contract was not renewed by the board of education, he accepted a superintendent position in Naperville, Illinois.

The current superintendent is Dr. Marty Pollio, who is the former principal at Doss and Jeffersontown high schools. Pollio was named acting superintendent in July 2017 when Hargens resigned amidst a great deal of public pressure. In February 2018, Pollio was offered a four-year contract and was able to drop acting from the title.

COVID-19
When a Louisville man sought to attend a public Jefferson County Board of Education (JCBE) board meeting at a Jefferson County Public Schools (JCPS) building  during the COVID-19 pandemic in Kentucky in August 2022, officers asked him to put on a mask, and the man refused. Alternatively, the man was offered a face shield, or a COVID-19 test, or the opportunity to request a waiver, all of which the man also refused; accordingly, he was not granted entry into the building. Attorney General Daniel Cameron claimed the district had violated Kentucky's "Open Meetings Act."  JCBE argues that at the time, masks were required to enter the building, not the meeting itself, as part of the board's July 2022 Health Guidance Plan, which requires that when community spread of COVID-19 is ranked "high" in Jefferson County (which it was at the time), masks must be worn to enter JCPS property. The man had previously filed unsuccessful claims against the Board alleged that among other things it had violated the Nuremburg Code by "participating in human experimentation, and "sexually exploited minors." In January 2023 the board appealed Cameron's decision in Jefferson County Circuit Court.

Initiatives

The school district is engaged in a number of initiatives, some of which have been considered more successful than others.

Every 1 Reads

Every 1 Reads is a community-wide literacy program that was started in the fall of 2003 as a partnership between Greater Louisville, Inc., the Louisville Metro government, and the Jefferson County Public Schools (JCPS) in an effort to get every student reading at grade level by the fall of 2008.

In September 2007, the Bluegrass Institute for Public Policy Solutions (BIPPS) published an article which documented that the scoring system used by the school district's Every 1 Reads program conveys that children who cannot read "at grade level" are instead doing so. As of fall 2007, Every 1 Reads reports that 87.1% of all JCPS students are "reading at grade level," while the state system reports (at the end of the 2005–2006 school year) only 54.25% are at least proficient at reading.

GE "College Bound" program

In late 2005, the GE Foundation announced that it was providing the school district with a four-year $25-million grant, the largest non-governmental grant received by the district. This was part of the foundation's College Bound program, started in 1989 in an effort to increase the number of students going to college. This program includes a revamped Math and Science curriculum in a holistic K-12 approach involving the superintendent, the board of education and the teachers' union.

See also

 List of public schools in Louisville, Kentucky.(predominantly schools in JCPS)

References

External links
 
 Every 1 Reads

 
School districts in Kentucky
Education in Jefferson County, Kentucky
1975 establishments in Kentucky